Alfredo Cappellini was an Italian monitor converted from the floating crane GA53 during World War I. She bombarded Austro-Hungarian positions during the Eleventh Battle of the Isonzo in 1917 before she was wrecked off Ancona on 16 November 1917.

Development and description
Alfredo Cappellini was built when Cannone navali da 381/40 guns from the s became available after their construction was suspended in 1916. Her guns were built by Ansaldo-Schneider and originally destined for the Francesco Morosini. The ship was powered by one  vertical double-expansion steam engine.

Her hull and gun turret were unarmored, but she was protected by two anti-torpedo nets. Her main guns could elevate 20° and her turret could traverse 30° to either side.

Service
Alfredo Cappellini was launched in 1916, even before the battleships were officially suspended, by the Orlando Shipyard, in Livorno, completed on 24 April 1917 and commissioned four days later. Her first action came during the Eleventh Battle of the Isonzo in August 1917. She was wrecked on 16 November 1917 off Ancona.

References

Bibliography

External links
 Historical Ships Marina Militare website

World War I naval ships of Italy
1916 ships
Ships built in Livorno
Maritime incidents in 1917
World War I shipwrecks in the Adriatic Sea